Ibervillea is a genus of flowering plants belonging to the family Cucurbitaceae.

Its native range is Arizona, Oklahoma New Mexico, Texas and south to Mexico, Belize and Guatemala.

The genus name of Ibervillea is in honour of Pierre Le Moyne d'Iberville (1661–1706), a soldier, ship captain, explorer, colonial administrator, knight of the Order of Saint-Louis, adventurer, privateer, trader, member of Compagnies Franches de la Marine and founder of the French colony of Louisiana in New France.
It was first described and published in Erythea Vol.3 on page 75 in 1895.

Known species
According to Kew:
Ibervillea fusiformis 
Ibervillea hypoleuca 
Ibervillea lindheimeri 
Ibervillea macdougalii 
Ibervillea maxima 
Ibervillea millspaughii 
Ibervillea sonorae 
Ibervillea tenuisecta

References

Cucurbitaceae
Cucurbitaceae genera
Plants described in 1895
Flora of the South-Central United States
Flora of Mexico
Flora of Guatemala
Flora of Belize